P.A. Sanning Store, also known as E.M. Schell & Company and The Corner Market, is a historic general store located at Mary's Home, Miller County, Missouri.  It was built in 1906, and is a one-story, rectangular frame building on a concrete foundation.  It has a medium pitched hipped roof and features an elaborate pressed galvanized metal "boomtown" front cornice.

It was added to the National Register of Historic Places in 2005.

References

Commercial buildings on the National Register of Historic Places in Missouri
Commercial buildings completed in 1906
Buildings and structures in Miller County, Missouri
National Register of Historic Places in Miller County, Missouri
1906 establishments in Missouri